When the conservative Prime Minister Poul Schlüter resigned on the 15 January 1993 because of the Tamil Case, the leader of the Social Democrats Poul Nyrup Rasmussen formed his first cabinet on the 25 January 1993. The cabinet consisted of the Social Democrats, the Social Liberal Party, the Centre Democrats and the Christian People's Party.

Thie Cabinet of Poul Nyrup Rasmussen I was replaced by the Cabinet of Poul Nyrup Rasmussen II on 27 September 1994 after the Social Democrats won the 1994 Danish parliamentary election.

Cabinet changes
The cabinet was changed on 29 March 1993, 28 January 1994, 8 February 1994 and on the 11 February 1994

|}

1993 establishments in Denmark
1994 disestablishments in Denmark
Rasmussen, Poul Nyrup 1
Cabinets established in 1993
Cabinets disestablished in 1994